Chris G. Van de Walle is a Professor in the Materials Department at the University of California, Santa Barbara.  He received a Ph.D. in Electrical Engineering from Stanford University in 1986. Prior to joining UCSB in 2004, he was a Principal Scientist at the Xerox Palo Alto Research Center (PARC).  His research interests include first-principles calculations for materials, defects and doping in semiconductors and oxides, surfaces and interfaces, and the physics of hydrogen in materials. Van de Walle is a Fellow of the APS, MRS, AAAS, AVS, and IEEE.  He is the recipient of a Humboldt Research Award for Senior US Scientist, the Medard W. Welch Award, and the David Adler Award from the APS.

References

Living people
University of California, Santa Barbara faculty
Stanford University alumni
Year of birth missing (living people)
Fellows of the American Physical Society